James David Thomas Argent (born 5 December 1987) is an English television personality. From 2010 to 2018, he was a regular cast member on the ITVBe reality series The Only Way Is Essex. He has appeared in various other reality series, such as Sugar Free Farm and The Jump, and in 2019, he presented the entertainment segment on Good Morning Britain.

Career 
From 2010 to 2018, Argent was a cast member of the ITVBe reality series The Only Way Is Essex. In 2013, Argent participated in the first series of the Channel 5 reality series Celebrity Super Spa. In July 2015, it was announced that Argent would make his first pantomime appearance in a production of Cinderella at the Kings Theatre, Southsea. He was cast as Dandini. The production ran from December 2015 until January 2016. In 2016, he took part in the ITV's Sugar Free Farm and Channel 4's The Jump. In December 2018, Argent made another pantomime appearance, as Abanazar in Aladdin, which took place at the Middleton Arena. In 2018, it was announced that producers The Only Way Is Essex had not renewed their contract with Argent.

Personal life 
In August 2014, Argent was reported missing from his home when he failed to show up for a scheduled flight; however, he was found just over 24 hours later. In October 2014, Argent was suspended from The Only Way Is Essex after failing a drugs test. He attended rehab later that year, and returned to the series in 2015.

Argent was in a relationship with Lydia Bright from 2007 to 2012 and 2015 to 2016. Argent briefly dated Gemma Collins in 2012; and the pair were in an on-and-off relationship from December 2017 until July 2020. Since 2022, he has been dating Stella Turian, an Italian actress who is 17 years his junior.

James has been regularly an inpatient at rehabilitation facilities due to drug abuse including cocaine.

In April 2021, Argent underwent a sleeve gastrectomy procedure, after his weight reached 27 stone (378 lbs).

Filmography

Stage

See also 
List of solved missing person cases

References

External links 

1987 births
2010s missing person cases
English male television actors
Formerly missing people
Living people
Missing person cases in England
People from Brentwood, Essex
People from the London Borough of Waltham Forest
Television personalities from London